KZBE (104.3 FM, "B-104.3 FM") is a radio station broadcasting a hot adult contemporary music format. Licensed to Omak, Washington, United States, the station is currently owned by North Cascades Broadcasting, Inc. and features programming from Westwood One.

References

External links

Radio stations established in 1964
ZBE